François Pierre Philippe Bonlieu (21 March 1937 – 18 August 1973) was a French alpine skier.

Born at Juvincourt-et-Damary, Aisne, Bonlieu debuted for the French alpine skiing national team when he was 15 years old. From 1958 until 1959 he became a four times French Champion (twice in the Giant Slalom, once in the Slalom and Alpine Combined). He was murdered at Croisette in Cannes after an argument.

References

1937 births
1973 deaths
Sportspeople from Aisne
French male alpine skiers
Olympic gold medalists for France
Alpine skiers at the 1956 Winter Olympics
Alpine skiers at the 1960 Winter Olympics
Alpine skiers at the 1964 Winter Olympics
Male murder victims
Olympic medalists in alpine skiing
Medalists at the 1964 Winter Olympics
Olympic alpine skiers of France
20th-century French people